Pantai is a mukim and settlement in Seremban District, Negeri Sembilan, Malaysia. Pantai is the Malay word for "beach" even though Pantai is located inland. One theory suggests that there was a lot of sand which in a way looks like a beach. Pantai is linked by Jalan Jelebu Federal Route 86 which links Pantai to Seremban and Kuala Klawang. Jalan Sikamat  links Pantai to Sikamat.

References 

Mukims of Negeri Sembilan
Populated places in Negeri Sembilan